Olearia glandulosa, commonly known as swamp daisy-bush, is a species of flowering plant in the family Asteraceae and is endemic to south-eastern Australia. It is a slender, erect, glabrous shrub with sticky, narrowly linear leaves and white or pale blue and yellow, daisy-like inflorescences.

Description

Taxonomy
Swamp daisy-bush was first formally described in 1806 by Jacques Labillardière who gave it the name Aster glandulosus in his Novae Hollandiae Plantarum Specimen. In 1867, George Bentham changed the name to Olearia glandulosa in the Flora Australiensis. The specific epithet (glandulosa) means "gland-bearing".

Distribution and habitat
Olearia glandulosa grows in wet heath, swamps and along river banks in far south-eastern Queensland, south of Mittagong in south-eastern New South Wales and the Australian Capital Territory, mostly south of the Great Dividing Range in Victoria, in the far south-east of South Australia, and in Tasmania.

References

glandulosa
Asterales of Australia
Flora of the Australian Capital Territory
Flora of New South Wales
Flora of South Australia
Flora of Tasmania
Flora of Queensland
Flora of Victoria (Australia)
Taxa named by Jacques Labillardière
Plants described in 1806